The Bisu M3 is a 7-seat MPV with a 2-2-3 configuration produced by Bisu Auto, a brand of the Chonqing Bisu Automotive Corporation, which is closely related to Beiqi-Yinxiang, a joint venture between Beijing Auto (Beiqi) and the Yinxiang Group.

Overview 

The Bisu M3 was based on the same platform as the Huansu H3 launched in 2015, and was officially launched by the end of 2016 with prices ranging from 61,900 to 83,900 yuan at launch. The power of the Bisu M3 comes from a 1.5 liter four-cylinder petrol engine developing 114hp and 147nm, mated to a five-speed manual transmission powering the front wheels. A 1.5 liter turbo engine with 140hp was made available from 2017.

References

External links 

 Bisu Official Website

M3
Cars introduced in 2016
Minivans
Front-wheel-drive vehicles
2010s cars
Cars of China